Valeria Ivanovna Kuzmenko Titova (born 28 February 1934 — 9 October 2010) is a former female tennis player who competed for the Soviet Union.

She was born on February 28, 1934, in Kyiv. Pupil of coach Vladimir Balva. She was the first Soviet tennis player to participate in the French Open in 1960. She died on October 9, 2010, in the United States, where she was being treated. She was the wife of Olympic champion Soviet gymnast Yuri Titov. Member of the Russian Tennis Hall of Fame since 2007 and the Ukrainian Tennis Hall of Fame since 2015.

She played in singles at the French Open in 1960. She lost to the Australian player Jan Lehane in the Second Round.

She played in Singles at the Wimbledon in 1961. She lost to the American Donna Floyd in the First Round. Her partner in Women's Doubles, citizen Anna Dmitrieva lost in the Quarterfinals to the South African players Margaret Hunt and Lynette Hutchings. Her partner in mixed doubles Toomas Leius lost in the Second Round to the Brazilian player Carlos Fernandes and Australian Margaret Hellyer.

Career finals

Singles (7–6)

Doubles (5–6)

References

1934 births
2010 deaths
Soviet female tennis players